James Winfield Karber (July 8, 1914–September 2, 1976) was an American lawyer, businessman, and politician.

Karber was born in Elizabethtown, Illinois. He went to the Ridgway Community High School in Ridgway, Illinois. Karber received his bachelor's and law degrees from University of Illinois. He was admitted to the Illinois bar in 1936. Karber also served as an ordained Baptist minister. He served as state's attorney for Gallatin County, Illinois and was involved with the Democratic Party. Karber was involve with the Gallatin County Bank in Ridgway, Illinois and the oil industry. He was a farmer. Karber served in the Illinois House of Representatives from 1947 to 1951. From 1961 to 1969, Karber served on the Illinois Commerce Commission and served as chair of the commission. Karber died at Welborn Baptist Hospital in Evansville, Indiana after suffering a heart attack at his home in Ridgway, Illinois.

Notes

External links

1914 births
1976 deaths
People from Elizabethtown, Illinois
People from Gallatin County, Illinois
University of Illinois alumni
Illinois lawyers
Businesspeople from Illinois
Farmers from Illinois
District attorneys in Illinois
Democratic Party members of the Illinois House of Representatives
20th-century American politicians
20th-century American businesspeople
20th-century American lawyers
20th-century Baptist ministers from the United States